Liosynaphaeta balloui is a species of beetle in the family Cerambycidae, and the only species in the genus Liosynaphaeta. It was described by Fisher in 1926.

References

Mesosini
Beetles described in 1926